The 2018–19 Auburn Tigers men's basketball team represented Auburn University during the 2018–19 NCAA Division I men's basketball season as a member of the Southeastern Conference.  The team's head coach was Bruce Pearl in his 5th season at Auburn.  The team played their home games at the Auburn Arena in Auburn, Alabama. They finished the season 30–10, 11–7 in SEC play. They defeated Missouri, South Carolina, Florida, and Tennessee to win the SEC tournament. They received an automatic bid to the NCAA tournament where they defeated New Mexico State, Kansas, North Carolina, and Kentucky to advance to their first Final Four in school history where they lost to Virginia.

Previous season 
Auburn finished the 2017–18 season 26–8, 13–5 in SEC play to win a share of the SEC regular season championship. They lost to Alabama in the quarterfinals of the SEC tournament. They received an at-large bid to the NCAA tournament where they defeated College of Charleston to advance to the Second Round where they lost to Clemson.

Offseason

Departures

Incoming transfers

Roster

Schedule and results

|-
! colspan=9 style=| Exhibition

|-
! colspan=9 style=| Non-conference regular season

|-
! colspan=9 style=| SEC regular season

|- 
! colspan=9 style=| SEC Tournament

|-
! colspan=9 style=| NCAA tournament

Rankings

*AP does not release post-NCAA Tournament rankings^Coaches did not release a Week 2 poll.

Awards and honors

Bryce Brown
Jerry West Award Preseason Watch List
Preseason Media Second Team All-SEC
Preseason Coaches' Second Team All-SEC
Coaches' Second Team All-SEC
SEC All-Tournament Team
SEC Tournament MVP

Jared Harper
Bob Cousy Award Preseason Watch List
Preseason Media Second Team All-SEC
Preseason Coaches' Second Team All-SEC
Maui Jim Maui Invitational All-Tournament Team
AP Second Team All-SEC
Coaches' Second Team All-SEC
SEC All-Tournament Team
NCAA Midwest Regional All-Tournament Team
NCAA Midwest Regional MVP

Chuma Okeke
SEC All-Tournament Team
NCAA Midwest Regional All-Tournament Team

Austin Wiley
Kareem Abdul-Jabbar Award Preseason Watch List

References

Auburn Tigers men's basketball seasons
Auburn
Auburn
Auburn
Auburn
NCAA Division I men's basketball tournament Final Four seasons